The Cloisters Apocalypse, MS 68.174 is a small French illuminated manuscript dated c. 1330. It is based on John the Evangelist's New Testament visions and apocalyptic revelation. According to Christian legend John was exiled c. 95 CE to the Aegean island of Patmos, where he wrote the Book of Revelation. The book evokes John's despair and isolation while exiled, and his prophecy of events and terrors of the last days.

The manuscript was probably influenced by the c. 776 writings of the Spanish monk Beatus of Liébana, who contextualised the writings of Saint John into an early medieval context. Today it is in the collection of The Cloisters, in New York.

Style and attribution
In form and style, the manuscript resembles two other books created in Normandy c. 1320–1330: the British Library Add MS 17333, an Apocalypse manuscript known as the "Val-Dieu Apocalypse", and Bibliothèque nationale de France, MS lat. 14410: the "Apocalypse of Saint-Victor". All three were produced on the continent, but based on late 13th century English sources, probably another manuscript such as "The Lambeth Apocalypse" (London, Lambeth Palace, MS 209). The latter manuscript contains a number of details closely resembling those in the "Cloisters Apocalypse", which is thought to be the common source for all three. 

The Cloisters book differs from the others in the group in one important aspect; it begins with a preliminary cycle from the childhood of Jesus.

Text
The book opens with God and the Seven Angels instructing and prophesying the bishops of Seven churches of Asia to conquer and spread the word of the Holy Spirit. These episodes are followed by incidents from John's life and travels, especially his exile on the island of Patmos. The book begins with scenes from the early life of Christ. Throughout there are multiple heraldic shields, although many are badly damaged or faded.

Miniatures
The book contains 72 half or full page miniature illustrations, most of which are courtly in the early 14th century style, although the borders of the leaves are richly detailed. Folio 9 verso contains six armorial shields on the border of an altar cloth. In keeping with a book of revelations, contain scenes of pessimism and violence, while miniatures show a bleeding Christ by a tree. The marginalia contains grotesque beasts and daemons. These depictions include fragments of altar tables and doves, with the Souls of the Dead, martyrs, and crucifixion trees. 

Overall the book takes a soft approach to John's revelations, with the illuminations mainly in the soft style, and courtly, typically Gothic, scenes of domesticity interspersing with darker figures, but all painted in a manner influenced with Spanish art of the period.

The later miniatures mostly emphasise John's proximity and bond with Jesus.

Four Horsemen
A number of miniatures detail the Four Horsemen of the Apocalypse, individually and in groups. The knightly saints are identified through the colour mainly associated with them; St. George rides a white horse (associated with a royal steed), St. Theodore, holding the scales of famine, sits on a "gloomy" black horse, and St. Demetrius a red horse, (associated with the colour of blood). The fourth horseman, Death, rides a pale horse, traditionally "the color of decay", according to art historian Helmut Nickel.

Provenance
A coat of arms illustrated on one of the leaves suggests it was commissioned by a member of the de Montigny family of Coutances, Normandy. Stylistically it resembles other Norman illuminated books, as well as some designs on stained glass, of the period. The book was in Switzerland by 1368, possibly at the abbey of Zofingen, in the canton of Aargau. It was acquired by the Metropolitan Museum of Art in 1968.

Gallery

References

External links
 The Cloisters Apocalypse: An Early Fourteenth-Century Manuscript in Facsimile, full colour downloadable facsimile
 Online Renaissance: The Cloisters Apocalypse Fourteen part art history series on the Cloisters Apocalypse and its cognate manuscripts. 

14th-century illuminated manuscripts
Manuscripts of the Metropolitan Museum of Art
1330 books
Book of Revelation